Delivery Man is a 2013 American comedy-drama film written and directed by Ken Scott, produced by DreamWorks Pictures and Reliance Entertainment. A remake of the 2011 Canadian film, Starbuck, the film stars Vince Vaughn, Chris Pratt, and Cobie Smulders.

It was released by Touchstone Pictures on November 22, 2013, received mixed reviews and grossed $53 million.

Plot
David Wozniak is a deliveryman for his family's butcher shop, pursued by thugs to whom he owes $80,000. His girlfriend Emma, an NYPD officer, is pregnant with his child. One day, David returns from work to find a lawyer representing a sperm bank (where he gave 693 donations and earned a sum of $24,255 during his student years) who tells him that the clinic gave his samples to women in the clinic and that he has fathered 533 children. Of those, 142 have joined a class action lawsuit to force the fertility clinic to reveal the identity of "Starbuck," the alias he had used.

David's friend and lawyer Brett represents him as he tries to keep the records sealed. He provides him with profiles of each party to the lawsuit; David searches for them, finding moments for random acts of kindness. He covers for a struggling actor at his job so he can audition for a role. He pretends to be a pizza delivery man when he sees his daughter fighting with her boyfriend and saves her life as she ODs on drugs. He considers identifying himself but, after the thugs assault his father, he allows Brett to counter-sue the sperm bank for punitive damages. He wins the lawsuit, receives $200,000, and keeps his identity a secret.

David has regrets and thinks about revealing his identity. However, if he chooses to do so, he would lose the $200,000 that he won in the countersuit. Revealing to his father that he is Starbuck, his dad pays off David's debt. David finally reveals his identity on Facebook. Going to Emma's, he finds that she is going into premature labor. At the hospital, his baby is born, he proposes to Emma, and many of the children show up to see them.

In the closing sequence, David is shown to maintain contact with many of his children.

Cast

Production
The film is a remake of the 2011 French-Canadian film Starbuck which was also directed by Scott; Starbuck was also the working title for the English-language production.

Filming began in October 2012 in the Hudson Valley of New York. Filming then moved to New York City locales, in Brooklyn and Manhattan. Concerning the number of extras as the children, actor Dave Patten said, "There were ten of us who were constants on the sets so we didn’t really bond with the others who were extras. But the ten of us became a huge pack of friends and it was really nice. There are usually a lot of egos on set when it comes to a big cast which causes people not to get along but we didn’t have that issue."

Release
Delivery Man was released worldwide in November 2013 by Walt Disney Studios Motion Pictures through the Touchstone Pictures label, except for most international territories, where the rights are sold by Mister Smith Entertainment to other independent distributors. DreamWorks' financial partner, Reliance Entertainment, had released the film in India.

Reception
Delivery Man received mixed reviews from critics. Review aggregation website Rotten Tomatoes gave the film a score of 40% based on reviews from 148 critics with an average score of 5.00/10. The site's consensus says: "It has an undeniably sweet charm, and Vince Vaughn is eminently likable in the lead role, but Delivery Man suffers in comparison to Starbuck, the hit Canadian comedy that inspired it." At Metacritic the film received a score of 44/100 based on reviews from 33 critics.

Alonso Duralde of The Wrap gave the film a negative review, stating that "Delivery Man offers comedy and sentimentality in equal doses and, unfortunately, equal efficacy—the jokes, the characters and the situations aren't very funny, and the would-be heart-tuggery is mostly embarrassing." Peter Debruge of Variety wrote, "Delivery Man is virtually nothing like a [typical] Vince Vaughn movie, but rather a heartfelt celebration of the act of parenthood presented under radically exaggerated circumstances... the director demonstrates the good sense not to mess with success, engineering what amounts to a scene-for-scene remake of that earlier feel-good outing—with the notable addition of Chris Pratt in his funniest supporting performance yet." Michael Rechtshaffen of The Hollywood Reporter wrote that "it's nice to see Vaughn moving out of his fast-talking comfort zone in a role that requires him to be more quietly reactive; while Parks and Recreation’s Pratt comically raises the second-banana bar as a put-upon dad itching to get back into the courtroom. While Smulders, unfortunately, isn't given the same opportunity to show off her comedic chops regularly on display on How I Met Your Mother, acclaimed Polish actor Andrzej Blumenfeld (in his American debut) makes a more empathetic impression as the warm Wozniak family patriarch."

See also
 Fonzy, a 2013 French remake of Starbuck

Notes

References

External links
 
 
 
 
 

2013 films
2010s legal films
American comedy-drama films
American legal drama films
American remakes of Canadian films
DreamWorks Pictures films
Entertainment One films
Films about families
Films directed by Ken Scott
Films scored by Jon Brion
Indian films set in New York City
Films shot in New York City
Midlife crisis films
Reliance Entertainment films
Films about sperm donation
Touchstone Pictures films
2013 comedy-drama films
2010s English-language films
Indian comedy-drama films
Indian legal drama films
2010s American films
American pregnancy films
English-language Indian films